Rockin’ Rudolph is the third Christmas album by The Brian Setzer Orchestra, released on October 16, 2015, through Surfdog Records. Produced by Peter Collins, it is the band's first Christmas album in ten years.

Promotion
In support of the album, The Brian Setzer Orchestra embarked on the 12th Annual Christmas Rocks! Tour. In the midst of the tour they performed at an invitation-only event for SiriusXM at The Hard Rock Café in Times Square. The concert was broadcast across SiriusXM channels in the days that followed.

Critical reception

Rockin' Rudolph received mostly positive reviews from music critics. Stephen Thomas Erlewine of AllMusic rated the album three out of five stars and states: "Rockin' Rudolph deserves to sit proudly alongside the Brian Setzer Orchestra's other five Christmas albums because it serves up snazzy seasonal swingers, tunes that revel in their retro-kitsch."

Track listing
Source: iTunes

Personnel
Credits adapted from AllMusic:

Production
Brian Setzer - arranger
Peter Collins - producer
Steve Gibson - producer
Terry Christian - engineer, mixing
Don Cobb - mastering
Eric Conn - mastering
Dave Darling - additional production
Frank Comstock - arranger
Mark Jones - arranger
Dave Kaplan - executive producer
Tim Messina - music director
Jody Nardone - vocal arrangement
Kristen Carranza - production coordination
Joey Waterman - production coordination
Tyler Sweet - guitar technician
Derek Yaniger - cover art
Scott Anderson - layout

Musicians
Brian Setzer - guitar, vocals
Roy Agee - trombone
Sean Billings - trumpet
Ron Blake - trumpet
Mike Briones - trombone
Shannon Brown - vocals (background)
Barry Green - trombone
John Hatton - bass
Mike Haynes - trumpet
Robbie Hioki - trombone
Jamie Hovorka - trumpet
Paul Leim - drums
Sam Levine - saxophone
Jeremy Levy - trombone
Kerry Loeschen - trombone
Tim Messina - saxophone
Eric Morones - saxophone
Jody Nardone - vocals (background)
Steve Patrick - trumpet
Charlie Peterson - saxophone
Tony Pia - drums
Steve Reid - trumpet
Matt Rollings - piano
Julie Setzer - vocals (background)
Leslie Spencer - vocals (background)
David Spicher - bass
Jim Youngstrom - saxophone
Matt Zebly - saxophone

Chart performance

Release history

References

External links
 

The Brian Setzer Orchestra albums
2015 Christmas albums
Christmas albums by American artists
Surfdog Records albums
Swing Christmas albums
Albums produced by Peter Collins (record producer)